"Microphone Mathematics" is the second single by Quasimoto, the rapping alter ego of Madlib. These tracks later appeared on his debut album The Unseen. On the album, however, "Discipline 99" was split into 2 tracks. Part 0 featured "Mr. Herb," while part 1 featured Wildchild of the Lootpack.

Track listing

Side A
 Microphone Mathematics
 Discipline #99 (feat. The Lootpack)
 Low Class Conspiracy (feat. Madlib)

Side B
 Microphone Mathematics (Instrumental)
 Discipline #99 (feat. The Lootpack) (Instrumental)
 Low Class Conspiracy (feat. Madlib) (Instrumental)

1999 singles
1999 songs
Madlib songs
Song recordings produced by Madlib